East Korea(n) Bay, also formerly known in English as Broughton Bay, is a bight in the east coast of North Korea and an extension of the Sea of Japan, located between the provinces of South Hamgyong and Kangwon.  Its northern end is Musu Dan, near the Musudan Village missile site which gave its name to North Korea's Taepodong and Musudan missiles. Whaling was once common in the region, targeting species such as fin whales.

See also
 Geography of North Korea
 Korea Bay (West Korea Bay)
 Korean Peninsula

References

Citations

Bibliography
 .

Bodies of water of North Korea
Bays of the Sea of Japan